Unwound are an American post-hardcore band.

Unwound may also refer to:
 "Unwound" (song), a 1981 song by George Strait
 Unwound (Unwound album), 1995
 Unwound (Tim Berne album), 1996